Epinotia chloana is a species of moth of the family Tortricidae. It is found in Morona-Santiago Province, Ecuador.

The wingspan is about 22 mm. The forewings are white with greenish suffusions and black markings. The hindwings are whitish, mixed with pale brownish grey at the apex.

Etymology
The species name refers to colouration of the forewings and is derived from Greek chloanus (meaning greenish).

References

Moths described in 2006
Eucosmini